Ellis Cornish Watson (1843 – December 12, 1906) was an English-born merchant and political figure in Newfoundland. He represented Trinity Bay in the Newfoundland and Labrador House of Assembly from 1885 to 1889.

Biography
He was born in Torquay, Devon. He first came to Newfoundland in 1858 and returned to England in 1862. In 1865, he set up a business at Hant's Harbour; his brother James later joined him in business there. In 1870, Watson purchased a business at L'Anse-au-Loup. He served as Superintendent of Fisheries from 1898 to 1906. He died in Montreal in 1906.

His son Robert also served in the Newfoundland assembly.

References 

Members of the Newfoundland and Labrador House of Assembly
1906 deaths
1843 births
English emigrants to pre-Confederation Newfoundland
Newfoundland Colony people